Malcolm Collett started his career in animation at the Vancouver School of Art in 1969, now the Emily Carr Art and Design, Vancouver, BC. He worked as an animation cameraman for Canadian Pioneer Animator Al Sens after graduating in 1973. In 1975 Collett was hired to work as an associate producer with Milton Fruchtman at the Banff School of Fine Arts to work on a series of documentary films financed by the Devonian Foundation of Calgary, AB. The series of films utilized the Glenbow Institute's art collections. The first of the series, Search for the Western Sea told the story of Alexander Mackenzie's journey to the Pacific Ocean using the paintings of western artists to tell the story. The film was narrated by Christopher Plummer and music score by Kenyon Hopkins. The film's debut aired on CBC in 1976 and also received a Silver award at the New York Film Festival, for best television documentary film.

In 1979 Collett opened his animation company, Marmalade Animation producing television programming and animated television commercials. He produced the first Canadian independent animated half-hour for television in Western Canada, Tales of the Mouse Hockey League.  The film aired on CBC National in April 1987 and received an 80% viewer rating. Collett has worked on films for the National Film Board of Canada, BC Lotteries Corporation, Mohawk Oil, BC Ministry of Education, Alberta Government, CBC Television over a 15-year span.

References

1969 births
Living people
Canadian animators
Canadian animated film producers